Unknown Instructors are an all-star improvisational rock outfit that features the former rhythm section of Minutemen and fIREHOSE, bassist Mike Watt and drummer George Hurley; Saccharine Trust members, guitarist Joe Baiza and vocalist Jack Brewer; and vocalist/saxophonist Dan McGuire. They have been described as "an all-star reunion of alumni from the SST stable of yore" and Henry Rollins called it a dream lineup.

Their first album, The Way Things Work, was released in late September 2005 by Smog Veil Records.  In October 2005, they returned to the studio to record a second album, this time with Pere Ubu's David Thomas and artist Raymond Pettibon as added participants. The finished product, The Master's Voice, was released in March, 2007. A third album, Funland, followed in 2009. In 2019, the fourth album entitled Unwilling to Explain was released with J Mascis on guitar. It was the first Unknown Instructors album that wasn't improvised.

Discography
The Way Things Work (2005, Smog Veil Records)
The Master's Voice (2007, Smog Veil Records)
Funland (2009, Smog Veil Records)
Unwilling to Explain (2019, ORG Music)

References

External links
Official Unknown Instructors page

American rock music groups
Mike Watt
Supergroups (music)